Mohammed Mubarak Suwaid Al-Hinai (born 19 July 1984), is an Omani footballer who plays for Fanja SC.

Club career statistics

International career
Mohammed was selected for the national team for the first time in 1999. He has made appearances in the 2003 Gulf Cup of Nations, the 2004 Gulf Cup of Nations, the 2004 AFC Asian Cup qualification, the 2004 AFC Asian Cup, the 2007 Gulf Cup of Nations and the 2007 AFC Asian Cup qualification and the 2007 AFC Asian Cup.

He also played at the 2001 FIFA U-17 World Championship in Trinidad and Tobago and scored two goals, one in a 1-2 loss against Spain and another in a 1-1 draw against Burkina Faso

FIFA World Cup Qualification
Mohammed has made three appearances in the 2006 FIFA World Cup qualification and six in the 2010 FIFA World Cup qualification.

In the 2006 FIFA World Cup qualification, he scored a brace in the Second Round in a 5-1 win over India.

In the 2010 FIFA World Cup qualification, he scored one goal in the First Round in a 2-0 win over Nepal.

National team career statistics

Goals for Senior National Team

Honours

Club
With Fanja
Oman Professional League (1): 2011–12; Runner-Up 2012–13, 2013-14
Sultan Qaboos Cup (1): 2013-14
Oman Professional League Cup (1): 2014-15
Oman Super Cup (1): 2012; Runner-Up 2013, 2014

References

External links
 
 
 Mohamed Al Hinai at Goal.com
 
 

1984 births
Living people
People from Muscat, Oman
Omani footballers
Association football midfielders
2004 AFC Asian Cup players
Oman Club players
Al-Nasr SC (Salalah) players
Fanja SC players
Oman Professional League players
Expatriate footballers in Kuwait
Omani expatriate sportspeople in Kuwait
Footballers at the 2006 Asian Games
Asian Games competitors for Oman
Oman international footballers
Al-Sahel SC (Kuwait) players
Qadsia SC players
Kuwait Premier League players
Al Tadhamon SC players